Mickaël Joseph Niçoise (born 19 September 1984) is a Guadeloupean professional footballer who plays as a striker for French club Meaux.

Club career

Youth
Born in Bondy, Seine-Saint-Denis, Niçoise began playing football at an early age in his hometown club, the ASCC Chelles. He was spotted at 13 by AJ Auxerre but left the family nest at 14 to join the sports study CS Meaux and the training center of Paris Saint-Germain .

Senior
Niçoise began his senior career at Amiens SC training center that offered him his first professional contract in 2003. He signed his professional contract under Denis Troch. He played in a Coupe de la Ligue match against Troyes. Arrived in extra time, he qualify his team with  his penalty during the session of shots in the purpose . Alex Dupont's arrival will push him then towards the exit.

In 2005, he signed with Belgian club FC Brussels. During his first experience outside France he was coached by French manager Albert Cartier. Partnering Igor de Camargo in attack, he registered 3 goals for 26 league matches.

In 2006, Elijah joined Süper Lig side Gençlerbirliği S.K.

In 2007, he returned to Belgium signing with Mouscron.

In 2008, he moved to Switzerland to play for Neuchâtel Xamax.

He spent part of the 2008–09 season with Ethnikós Áchnas but agreed the termination of his contract after six months with the Cypriot club.

In 2010, Niçoise played for Réunion side SS Saint-Louisienne.

In summer 2011, Niçoise signed a three-year contract with Egyptian club Al-Masry SC. He did not make an appearance for the club.

In early 2012, he signed with Malaysian Super League side PKNS F.C. as a free agent following a one-week trial. He was made vice-captain of PKNS. He scored 5 goals in his first 4 matches. He later injured his anterior cruciate ligament.

In 2013, he signed with Finnish second-tier club PK-35 Vantaa.

In 2015, he played for Maziya S&RC of the Maledives.

International career
Niçoise made his debut for Guadeloupe at the Caribbean Cup in December 2008 against Cuba. He scored in his second game against Haiti.

Personal life
He is Muslim, having converted to Islam. He also has two daughters.

References

External links
 
 

1984 births
Living people
Sportspeople from Bondy
French people of Guadeloupean descent
Association football forwards
French footballers
Guadeloupean footballers
CS Meaux players
R.W.D.M. Brussels F.C. players
Gençlerbirliği S.K. footballers
Royal Excel Mouscron players
Ethnikos Achna FC players
Al Masry SC players
Belgian Pro League players
Süper Lig players
Swiss Super League players
Cypriot First Division players
PKNS F.C. players
Expatriate footballers in Belgium
Expatriate footballers in Turkey
Expatriate footballers in Switzerland
Expatriate footballers in Cyprus
French expatriate footballers
Expatriate footballers in Egypt
French Muslims
Converts to Islam
Guadeloupe international footballers
Footballers from Seine-Saint-Denis